Merrellyn Tarr (born 11 April 1952) is a Zimbabwean archer. She competed in the women's individual event at the 1988 Summer Olympics.

References

1952 births
Living people
Zimbabwean female archers
Olympic archers of Zimbabwe
Archers at the 1988 Summer Olympics
Place of birth missing (living people)